Boolaroo Racecourse is a former racecourse near the suburb of Boolaroo, New South Wales, Australia. It is now grassland.

The racecourse was served by a railway station on the Main North Line that opened on 9 October 1902. The station was closed on 14 May 1942 and removed.

A number of aircraft used the racecourse as an emergency landing site, including the aircraft Southern Cross flown by Charles Kingsford Smith in 1927.

References

Disused regional railway stations in New South Wales
Defunct horse racing venues in Australia
Sports venues in New South Wales
Railway stations in Australia opened in 1902
Railway stations closed in 1942